Scopula jejuna is a moth of the  family Geometridae. It was described by Prout in 1932. It is found in Cameroon and Nigeria.

References

Insects of Cameroon
Insects of West Africa
Moths described in 1932
Moths of Africa
jejuna
Taxa named by Louis Beethoven Prout